Silicic is an adjective to describe magma or igneous rock rich in silica. The amount of silica that constitutes a silicic rock is usually defined as at least 63 percent. Granite and rhyolite are the most common silicic rocks.

Silicic is the group of silicate magmas which will eventually crystallise a relatively small proportion of ferromagnesian silicates, such as amphibole, pyroxene, and biotite. The main constituents of a silicic rock will be minerals rich in silica-minerals, like silicic Feldspar or even free silica as Quartz.

Example
The "Shammar group" is a silicic and volcaniclastic sequence in northwestern Saudi Arabia.

See also
Felsic
Mafic

References

Igneous rocks